The 1939 Washington Senators won 65 games, lost 87, and finished in sixth place in the American League. They were managed by Bucky Harris and played home games at Griffith Stadium.

Offseason 
 December 29, 1938: Al Simmons was purchased from the Senators by the Boston Bees for $3,000.

Regular season

Season standings

Record vs. opponents

Roster

Player stats

Batting

Starters by position 
Note: Pos = Position; G = Games played; AB = At bats; H = Hits; Avg. = Batting average; HR = Home runs; RBI = Runs batted in

Other batters 
Note: G = Games played; AB = At bats; H = Hits; Avg. = Batting average; HR = Home runs; RBI = Runs batted in

Pitching

Starting pitchers 
Note: G = Games pitched; IP = Innings pitched; W = Wins; L = Losses; ERA = Earned run average; SO = Strikeouts

Other pitchers 
Note: G = Games pitched; IP = Innings pitched; W = Wins; L = Losses; ERA = Earned run average; SO = Strikeouts

Relief pitchers 
Note: G = Games pitched; W = Wins; L = Losses; SV = Saves; ERA = Earned run average; SO = Strikeouts

Farm system

Notes

References 
1939 Washington Senators at Baseball-Reference
1939 Washington Senators team page at www.baseball-almanac.com

Minnesota Twins seasons
Washington Senators season
Washing